Bishop Perowne CE College is a Church of England secondary school with academy status located in Worcester, Worcestershire, England. It is a co-educational school, with a capacity of 1,050 pupils aged between 11 and 16.

The school is a specialist Performing Arts College and was the first Worcestershire school to take Specialist Performing Arts status in 2002.

The school takes its name from  two former Bishops of Worcester, John Perowne (Bishop of Worcester 1891–1901), and his son Arthur Perowne (Bishop of Worcester 1931–1941).

An Ofsted inspection in May 2012 judged the school to be Grade 2 (good). Lead inspector Michael Miller said: "The proportion of students achieving, and currently on track to achieve, five or more higher grade GCSE passes, including English and Mathematics, is above average. Opportunities for performance through the school's specialist status benefit students well and boost their confidence.

Awards
Leading  Aspect  Award
Arts mark Gold

References

Secondary schools in Worcestershire
Church of England secondary schools in the Diocese of Worcester
Academies in Worcestershire
Schools in Worcester, England